Billboard Utilising Graffitists Against Unhealthy Promotions, or B.U.G.A.U.P. ("bugger up") is an Australian subvertising artistic movement. It practices billboard hijacking using détournement or modification with graffiti of such billboard advertising that promotes something that is deemed unhealthy.

History
The movement started in inner-city Sydney in October 1979, later spreading to Melbourne, Hobart, Adelaide and Perth. It has been active ever since, although its peak of activity was in the late 1970s and early-mid 1980s. Many of the members came from professional and university-educated backgrounds. A founding member was Bill Snow, who first started to alter tobacco billboards with graffiti, and continued to be active in anti- smoking and littering campaigns. Together, Bill Snow, Ric Bolzan and Geoff Coleman coined the acronym BUGAUP and began adding it to the altered billboards, to link the graffiti to a movement rather than the random activity of individuals.

The movement aimed mainly at cigarette and alcohol advertising, often blanking out letters and adding others to promote their view that the product is unhealthy. Cola and soft drink ads were also targeted.

The movement did not formalize itself as a group with memberships or meetings. Graffitists "joined" by signing the BUGAUP name to their work. BUGAUP graffiti spread rapidly across Australia and then overseas.

Former New South Wales politician Arthur Chesterfield-Evans was a member of BUGAUP before entering politics.]

Other well-known BUGAUP members were the late Lord Bloody Wog Rolo, Peter Vogel and  Fred Cole.

Impact on tobacco advertising debate in Australia 
The Cancer Council of Western Australia states that the BUGA-UP campaign of the mid 1980s "radicalised the advertising debate and made it suddenly more respectable for previously conservative medical associations and colleges to rattle the legislative cage".
Former Daily News reporter Joanne Fowler states that prior to the BUGA-UP campaigns of the 1980s
journalists were unwilling to publish articles critical of the tobacco industry because they were 
seen to be mundane.
Almost all forms of tobacco advertising were made illegal in Australia in 1992.

See also
Billboard Liberation Front (aka Billboard Improvement)
Bill Snow
Lord Bloody Wog Rolo
Peter Vogel (computer designer)

External links
B.U.G.A.  U.P. website

References

Civil Disobedience and Tobacco Control: The Case of BUGA UP
B.U.G.A. U.P. : Autumn catalogue 1980, National Library of Australia
Buga-up on Trial, National Library of Australia
"Bugga Up (Smoking History)", George Negus Tonight, ABC TV
"No ifs, no butts – these boys were tough", Sydney Morning Herald, 12 October 2002
"Fred Cole", Sydney Morning Herald, 16 March 2009
"BUGA-UP interview", How to Make Trouble and Influence People, 2009
"BUGA UP – You've come a long way, baby", Overland, 23 August 2012

Australian fringe and underground culture
Graffiti in Australia
Anti-consumerist groups
Culture jamming
Culture of Sydney
Anti-smoking activists
1979 establishments in Australia